One Stolen Night is a 1929 American part-talkie adventure crime film directed by Scott R. Dunlap, and starring Betty Bronson, William Collier Jr., Mitchell Lewis, Harry Todd, and Charles Hill Mailes. It is based on the short story The Arab  by D. D. Calhoun. It is a remake of the 1923 film with the same name. The film was released by Warner Bros. on March 16, 1929.

Cast
Betty Bronson as Jeanne
William Collier Jr. as Bob
Mitchell Lewis as Blossom
Harry Todd as Blazer
Charles Hill Mailes as Doad
Nina Quartero as Chyra
Rose Dione as Madame Blossom
Otto Lederer as Abou-Ibu-Adam
Angelo Rossitto as The Dwarf
Jack Santoro as Brandon
Harry Schultz as The Sheik

Reception
According to Warner Bros records, the film earned $227,000 domestically and $15,000 foreign.

Preservation
The film survives in a 9.5mm copy at the BFI film archive.

References

External links

1929 adventure films
1929 crime films
American adventure films
American crime films
1929 films
American black-and-white films
Warner Bros. films
Transitional sound films
Lost American films
1929 lost films
Lost adventure films
1920s American films
1920s English-language films